Lee USA Speedway  is a short-track oval race track located in Lee, New Hampshire.

History
The facility opened as Lee Raceway in 1964 as a dirt tri-oval,  in length. Original owner Bob Bonser later recounted that he initially bought the land the track is located on in order to have a site along New Hampshire Route 125 to place advertising for a nudist camp that he owned and operated. Bonser paved the track the following year, and it became home to the New England Super Modified Racing Association (NESMRA).

In late 1983, the facility was purchased by Kenny Smith, Russ Conway, and Charlie Elliot, who had previously owned and operated Star Speedway in nearby Epping, New Hampshire. Renamed as Lee Speedway, the track was changed to be an oval,  in length, and reopened in the fall of 1984. The first event held at the reconfigured track reportedly drew 236 entrants. A section of the original tri-oval is still used as a pre-race staging area. 

The facility was sold to Red and Judy MacDonald in December 1986. Their son, Eddie MacDonald, became a professional race car driver. Branding of the track as Lee USA Speedway dates to at least 1996. The MacDonalds operated the track until February 2018, when it was sold to Norman Wrenn Jr. of Nashua, New Hampshire. Wrenn bought Monadnock Speedway in Winchester, New Hampshire, the same year.

In 2023 Lee USA Speedway was sold to Hudson Speedway owner Benjamin Bosowski.

Events
The track has hosted various racing events, including for NASCAR. Notable drivers who have competed at Lee include John Andretti, Gary Bettenhausen, Brett Bodine, Todd Bodine, Dale Earnhardt, Terry Labonte, Ollie Silva, and Bentley Warren. Snowmobile racing, demolition derby, and motorcycle races have also been held.

On August 20, 1973, a driver from nearby Madbury was killed in a racing accident at the track. On October 27, 1985, a driver from nearby Epping was killed in a racing accident at the track.

The track is a member of the New Hampshire Short Track Racing Association (NHSTRA). Entering the 2022 season, modified stock car racing is planned, including a NASCAR Whelen Modified Tour event.

See also
 New England Dragway, located in nearby Epping

Notes

References

External links

Lee USA Speedway race results at Racing-Reference

Motorsport venues in New Hampshire
Buildings and structures in Strafford County, New Hampshire
Tourist attractions in Strafford County, New Hampshire

NASCAR tracks
Sports venues completed in 1964
1964 establishments in New Hampshire